Harju is a village in Hiiumaa Parish, Hiiu County in northwestern Estonia.

The village is first mentioned in 1565 (Harie by). Historically, the village was part of Vaemla Manor.

References
 

Villages in Hiiu County